Natan Jurkovitz (נתן ג'ורקוביץ; born April 4, 1995) is a French-Swiss-Israeli basketball player. He plays the forward position.

Before he joined Lions de Genève, he played for Hapoel Be'er Sheva of the Israeli Premier Basketball League.

Biography

Jurkovitz was born in Poitiers, France, and his hometown is Villars-sur-Glâne, Canton of Fribourg, Switzerland. He is 6' 8" (202 cm) tall, and weighs 220 pounds (100 kg).

He played first for Fribourg Olympic in the Swiss Basketball League. Jurkovitz then played for Lions de Genève, another team in the Swiss Basketball League.  He averaged 12.1 points, 5.9 rebounds and 4.1 assists in the Swiss Basketball League in 2019-20. 

In August 2020 Jurkovitz left Lions de Genève to sign a three-year deal with Hapoel Be'er Sheva of the Israeli Premier Basketball League.

References

External links
Instagram page

1995 births
Living people
French expatriate basketball people
French men's basketball players
French people of Israeli descent
Fribourg Olympic players
Hapoel Be'er Sheva B.C. players
Lions de Genève players
Swiss expatriate basketball people
Swiss men's basketball players
Swiss people of French descent
Swiss people of Israeli descent